Prempura may refer to the following places in India:

 Prempura, Bhopal (census code 482424), a village near Bhadbhadaghat railway station in Huzur tehsil
 Prempura, Bhopal (census code 482362), a village near Bhopal Airport in Huzur tehsil
 Prempura, Kaithal, a village in Haryana
 Village Prempura, Lalsot, Dausa, Rajsthan

See also
 Prem Pura, a village in Phagwara tehsil